Fissidens polypodioides is a species of moss first classified by Johannes Hedwig.

References

Dicranales